Dua Garis Biru is a 2019 Indonesian teen drama film directed by Gina S. Noer and produced by Starvision Plus. The film mainly deals with teen pregnancy and features Angga Yunanda & Zara JKT48 in starring roles.

Premise 
Dara is a bright student raised in a middle-upper class family with a dream to continue her study in South Korea who is dating her slacker deskmate, Bima, who comes from a lower class family. One day, Bima goes too far and impregnated Dara. Now Dara's future is put on jeopardy as both face consequences of their mistake.

Cast 

 Angga Yunanda as Bima
 Zara JKT48 as Dara
 Dwi Sasono as Dara's father
 Lulu Tobing as Dara's mother
 Cut Mini as Bima's mother
 Arswendy Bening Swara as Bima's father
 Rachel Amanda as Dewi

Release 
It was released on July 11, 2019 and debuted with 178,000 audiences. Dua Garis Biru became the second Indonesia's most-watched film in 2019 with a total of 2,538,473 audiences, grossing over IDR 70 billion. It was also released in Malaysia, Singapore, and Brunei later that year.

Reception 
The film is critically acclaimed for its writing and acting and has been nominated for 26 different awards and categories, winning ten of them.

References 

2010s Indonesian-language films